"I Overlooked an Orchid" is a country song that was a hit for Mickey Gilley in 1974. It was first recorded by Carl Smith in 1950, achieving only modest sales when it was released as a single through Columbia Records. Country act Johnnie & Jack recorded the song in 1962 as part of their album Smiles and Tears, then it was released as the B-side to their single "Bye Bye Love" in early 1963.

Various people are credited with writing the song. Carl Smith has been named co-writer along with Arthur Q. Smith and Shirly Lyn. "Shirly Lyn" is a pseudonym of songwriter Troy Lee Martin, who wrote under several names. Carl Story was recorded telling a disc jockey that he wrote the song, but Carl Smith denied this version of events, pointing instead to Arthur Q. Smith as the co-writer. 

"I Overlooked an Orchid" was recorded by American country music artist Mickey Gilley, released in June 1974 as the second single from the album Room Full of Roses.  "I Overlooked an Orchid" was Mickey Gilley's second country hit and second number one on the country chart. The single stayed at number one for a week and spent a total of fourteen weeks on the country chart. The Gilley version had a small amount of crossover interest, peaking at number 104 in the Cashbox "Looking Ahead" survey, in August 1974.

Controversy 

Kentucky historian W. Lynn Nickell has written that Kentuckian Paul Gilley wrote the lyrics, then sold the song along with the rights, so that others could take credit for it.

Chart performance

References

1950 singles
1974 singles
Mickey Gilley songs
Song recordings produced by Eddie Kilroy
Playboy Records singles
1950 songs
1962 songs